Anne-Laure Cattelot (born 25 October 1988) is a French politician of Renaissance (RE) who has been serving as a member of the National Assembly of France between 2017 and 2022, where she represents the 12th constituency of the Nord.

Political career
Cattelot was elected to the 12th constituency of the North on 18 June 2017. She won in the second round against the candidate of the National Front. His predecessor in the constituency, Christian Bataille, beaten dry in the first round, gave him his support to block the National Front.

In the National Assembly, Cattelot sits on the Finance Committee. She is also a President of the Brewery sector's Working Group.

In 2018, Prime Minister Édouard Philippe entrusted Cattelot with the government's information mission "Industry of the future" to transform French companies by digital, to create the industry of the future.

Political positions
In October 2018, Cattelot denounced the overexploitation of the forest of Mormal by clear cuts and asked for the formation of a commission of inquiry in the National Assembly.

In July 2019, Cattelot voted in favor of the French ratification of the European Union’s Comprehensive Economic and Trade Agreement (CETA) with Canada.

See also
 2017 French legislative election

References

1988 births
Living people
People from Maubeuge
Deputies of the 15th National Assembly of the French Fifth Republic
La République En Marche! politicians
21st-century French women politicians
Women members of the National Assembly (France)
Members of Parliament for Nord